Stephen Cooper is an American editor, biographer and writer-producer. He is a Professor of English at California State University, Long Beach, and has also taught for many years with the Writers' Program of UCLA Extension.<ref>UCLA Extension Writers' Program, UCLA Extension Writers' Program'</ref> He was born, raised, and lives in Los Angeles.

Works
 Full of Life: A Biography of John Fante, North Point Press/FSG 2000; Angel City Press, 2005, 

Editor
 Perspectives on John Huston, G.K. Hall, 1994, 
  John Fante: A Critical Gathering, co-edited with David Fine, Fairleigh Dickinson University Press, 1999
 The Big Hunger: Stories 1932-1959, Black Sparrow Press, 2000, 
 The John Fante Reader (Ecco  Press 2003); HarperCollins, 2003, John Fante's 'Ask the Dust': A Joining of Voices and Views, co-edited with Clorinda Donato, Fordham University Press, 2020.

Writer-producer
 Struggle: The Life and Lost Art of Szukalski'', Netflix Original Documentary, 2018.

References

Year of birth missing (living people)
Living people
Writers from Los Angeles
University of California, Irvine alumni
University of Southern California alumni
California State University, Long Beach faculty
American academics of English literature